The Marzoni House is a historic house in Pensacola, Florida. Built in 1890, is an example of Queen Anne architecture.  It was listed on the National Register of Historic Places on May 10, 2016.

History
Louis D. Marzoni, born in 1856, ran a grocery store in Pensacola and worked for a lumber company. He later started a shipping firm, Smith & Marzoni. The house he had built was a model of Queen Anne style.  He built the house with old-growth heart pine like the export product from Pensacola. The Marzoni House has twelve foot ceilings and a plethora of custom built detail work and a corner octagonal tower. Very little of the house has been rebuilt. The Marzoni House, built in 1890 for Louis D. Marzoni, son of Antonio Marzoni, a newspaperman who ran "The Florida Democrat and mechanic's and workingman's advocate" and Pensacola Observer which ran from 1846 to 1856 and fought on the American Civil War.

References

External links
 Escambia County listings at National Register of Historic Places

National Register of Historic Places in Escambia County, Florida
Historic districts on the National Register of Historic Places in Florida
Queen Anne architecture in Florida
1890s in Florida